Women & Literature was an American feminist scholarly journal. Janet Margaret Todd, a British academic and author, founded the journal around the 1970s while she was teaching at Rutgers University. Women & Literature wrote about feminist film and literature and sought to support the feminist work of the 1970s. It advertised itself as “a scholarly journal of women writers and the literary treatment of women”. Issues included articles on women writers such as Jane Austen, Charlotte Bronte, and Mary Leadbeater.

Adrienne Rich, an influential American feminist poet, praised the publication after one of its issues, "Women and Film": “No one who pretends to a sound, broad, genuinely human scholarship can afford to remain ignorant of the work Women & Literature is now making available”.

Volumes 

 Volume 1: Gender and Literary Voice (1980)
 Volume 2: Men by Women (1981)
 Volume 3: Jane Austen: New Perspectives (1983)
 Volume 4: Women and Film (1988)

References 

Women's studies journals
Magazines established in 1974
Magazines disestablished in 1988
Defunct women's magazines published in the United States
Magazines published in New Jersey
Feminist magazines
Irregularly published magazines published in the United States